Oru Parish was a rural municipality in Lääne County, Estonia, that existed from 1992 to 2013.

After the municipal elections held on 20 October 2013, Oru Parish was merged with neighbouring Risti and Taebla parishes and a new Lääne-Nigula Parish was established.

In 2008 it had a population of 932 and an area of 197.7 km².

Settlements
Oru Parish had 15 villages:Auaste, Ingküla, Jalukse, Keedika, Kärbla, Linnamäe, Niibi, Oru, Mõisaküla, Salajõe, Saunja, Seljaküla, Soolu, Uugla and Vedra.

References

External links
 

Former municipalities of Estonia
Geography of Lääne County